Keum Suk Gendry-Kim  (born 1971) is a South Korean comic book artist and translator, winner of the Harvey Awards. She currently lives on Ganghwa Island.

Life 
Gendry-Kim was born in Goheung, South Jeolla Province. For economic reasons, her family moved from rural Korea to the capital Seoul during her childhood, a story portrayed in her work "Le chant de mon père". She left the country in 1994, moving to Paris.

She studied Western paintingl at Sejong University and in 1998 graduated in arts, specializing in sculpture  and  installation at the Strasbourg School of Decorative Arts. After graduating in 1998, she stayed on for another year to continue her studies. During this year she worked as a teaching assistant and assisted Korean exchange students, and completed her post-diplôme in the Relure section (bookbinding).

In 1997, when Gendry-Kim's mother went to spend some time in Paris, she learned of the story of her mother, who was separated from her sister during the Korean War, a drama later recounted in her work of fiction "The Waiting".

After his time at the Strasbourg School of Decorative Arts, she did some exhibitions and residencies abroad, but had financial difficulties. So she started a part-time job translating Korean comics into French, where she developed her interest in the genre. Keum Suk Gendry-Kim has translated about a hundred graphic novels.

After living years in France, Keum Suk Gendry-Kim and her husband Loïc Gendry moved to South Korea in 2011.

She had already published some smaller works in 2010 before making her comic book debut in 2012 with the autobiographical comic book Le chant de mon père, published by Éditions Sarbacane.

It was in 2013, when she worked on a short comic book called "Secret" based on victims' testimony, that she decided to write a comic book about the plight of sex slaves during the war, called 'comfort women', which resulted in her award-winning work "Grass".

Works 
 L'attente: Une famille coréenne brisée par la partition du pays (2021). English title: The Waiting.
 Jun (2020).
 L'Arbre Nu (2020).
 Alexandra Kim, la sibérienne (2020).
 Les Mauvaises herbes (2018). English title: Grass
 Jiseul (2015).
 De case en case: portraits de 15 bédéistes sud-coréens (2015).
 Le chant de mon père (2012).

Awards

References

External links 
 Keum Suk Gendry-Kim's blog

Harvey Award winners
South Korean manhwa artists
Female comics writers
1971 births
Living people